The Menyam language, Bamenyam, is a Grassfields Bantu language of Cameroon.

References

Languages of Cameroon
Nun languages